Mirowo may refer to the following places:
Mirowo, Greater Poland Voivodeship (west-central Poland)
Mirowo, Pomeranian Voivodeship (north Poland)
Mirowo, Warmian-Masurian Voivodeship (north Poland)
Mirowo, Gryfino County in West Pomeranian Voivodeship (north-west Poland)
Mirowo, Kołobrzeg County in West Pomeranian Voivodeship (north-west Poland)